Galoshes, also known as dickersons, gumshoes, rubbers, or overshoes, are a type of rubber boot that is slipped over shoes to keep them from getting muddy or wet. In the United States, the word galoshes may be used interchangeably with boot, especially a rubberized boot. In the United Kingdom, however, a galosh is an overshoe made of a weatherproof material to protect a more vulnerable shoe underneath and keep the foot warm and dry.

Instead of wrapping around the shoe spats and gaiters only cover the upper part of the shoe.

Etymology and usage
The word comes through French (galoche) from Latin galopia, in turn from Greek καλοπόδιον, from κᾶλον (wood) + πούς (foot).  By the 14th century it had been transferred to English style clogs; that is, those with a wooden sole, and fabric or leather upper.  By 1572 the term also applied to "a Gallage or Patten"; that is, an overshoe with a shaped wooden base to raise the wearer's good shoes off the ground.

"Goloshes" appears to be the older spelling of galoshes used previously in Great Britain. The spelling perhaps changed around 1920 to the present-day spelling.

Galoshes is also the word for shoes in the Azorean Portuguese language.

History
The transition from a traditional wooden sole to one of vulcanized rubber may be attributed to Charles Goodyear and Leverett Candee. The qualities of rubber, though fascinating to Goodyear, were highly dependent on temperature: it was tacky when hot, brittle when cold. Vulcanization of rubber tempered its properties so that it was easily molded, durable, and tough. A rubberized elastic webbing made Goodyear's galoshes (circa 1890) easy to pull on and off.

Galoshes are now almost universally made of rubber. In the bootmakers' trade, a "galosh" is the piece of leather, of a make stronger than, or different from, that of the "uppers", which runs around the bottom part of a boot or shoe, just above the sole.

A more modern term for galoshes could be rubber boots or bad weather shoes. Overshoes have evolved in the past decades and now are being made with more advanced features, such as high traction outsoles.

There are two basic types. One is like an oversize shoe or low boot made of thick rubber with a heavy sole and instep, designed for heavy-duty use. The other one is of much thinner, more flexible material, more like a rubber slipper, designed solely for protection against the wet rather than for extensive walking.

In Turkey, the word refers to a polythene overshoe that is worn temporarily when visiting homes or offices, to protect the floors against dirt from the outside.

See also

 Galesh
 Wellington boot

References 

Books
 Lawlor, Laurie. Where Will This Shoe Take You? A Walk Through the History of Footwear. New York: Walker and Company, 1996.
 Moilliet, J. L., ed. Waterproofing and Water-Repellency. London: Elsevier Publishing Company, 1963.
 O'Keefe, Linda. Shoes: A Celebration of Pumps, Sandals, Slippers, & More. New York: Workman Publishing, 1996.
 Yue, Charlotte and David. Shoes: Their History in Words and Pictures. Boston: Houghton Mifflin Company, 1997.
Periodicals
 Canizares, George. "Galosh Revolution." US Airways Attache (December 1998): 30.

Footwear accessories
History of clothing (Western fashion)
History of fashion
1920s fashion